Bad Wildbad is a town in Germany, in the state of Baden-Württemberg. It is located in the government district (Regierungsbezirk) of Karlsruhe and in the district (Landkreis) of Calw. Its coordinates are 48° 45' N, 8° 33' E. About 10,130 people live there. The current mayor is Mauro Gauger.

The current town of Bad Wildbad is an amalgamation of several communities brought together under local government reform in 1974. The member communities are Wildbad, Calmbach, Sprollenhaus, Nonnenmiß and Aichelberg, along with the hamlets of Hünerberg und Meistern. The town was named only Wildbad until 1991, when it was given its current name ("Bad" is German for "bath", a reference to the town's status as a spa town).

It is picturesquely situated 420 m above sea level, in the romantic pine-clad gorge of the Enz, a tributary of the Neckar in the Black Forest. The town is 45 km west of Stuttgart, 50 km southeast of Karlsruhe, 30 km south of Pforzheim, and 23 km east of Baden-Baden. The town has a direct Tram link to Pforzheim by Line S6 which runs from the Kurpark in the town, along King Karl Street itself to the town's old railway station before heading out into the country via Calmbach, Höfen an der Enz, Neuenbürg and Birkenfeld. Towering above Bad Wildbad is a small mountain, the Wildbader Sommerberg, whose top may be reached by the Sommerbergbahn, a funicular railway. It covers a vertical difference of about 300 m.

It is historically a popular medicinal spa. The neighbourhood is picturesque, the most attractive spot being the Wildsee—a small lake some distance from the town itself, measuring 2.3 ha, and at about 900 m above sea level.

The annual Rossini in Wildbad opera festival, held in July, brings an international audience to the Kurhaus and the Kurtheater to hear belcanto works by Gioachino Rossini and his contemporaries.

It is the scene of the early pages of Armadale by Wilkie Collins.

A part of Bad Wildbad is Aichelberg. There is a path: Fautsburg Path.

Transportation
Bad Wildbad is connected to Germany's national rail network through the Karlsruhe Stadtbahn, line S6, running on the Enz Valley Railway. Being located deep in the northern Black Forest, Bad Wildbad has no direct connection with any Autobahn. The nearest one is just west of Pforzheim.

Famous residents 

 Ludwig Hofacker, (1798–1828), was born in Wildbad, Württemberg author, politician (Paulskirche) and translator (Aristophanes) 
 Justinus Kerner (1786–1862), poet, writer and physician
 The Holocaust denier Ernst Zündel was born 1939 in Calmbach and grew up here and would live out his last years here following his deportation from Canada.
 ATP professional Marcello Graca grew up in Bad Wildbad
 The economist and financial scientist Rudolf Nickel (born 1942 in Nuremberg), grew up in Bad Wildbad.

Persons with reference to Bad Wildbad 
Duke Karl Alexander signed his contract (Schutzbrief) with the jewish merchant and bankier Joseph Ben Isachar Süßkind Oppenheimer in Bad Wildbad. Charles Alexander and his relationship with Oppenheimer is fictionally portrayed in Veit Harlan's 1940 Nazi propaganda film titled Jud Süß.

Notes

References

Further reading

Towns in Baden-Württemberg
Spa towns in Germany
Calw (district)
Württemberg